Solla Marandha Kadhai is a 2002 Tamil-language film. This film is based on writer Nanjil Nadan's novel Thalaikeezh vigithangal.

Plot
Sivadhanu(Cheran) is the eldest son of poor family and educated but unemployed person.He has the responsibility of marrying his sister and taking care of his younger sister

Chokkalingam (Pyramid Natarajan) notices Sivadhanu one day and 
asks (Janagaraj) about him.
He approaches Sivadhanu's family to marry Sivadhanu to his daughter Parvathi(Rathi) .Though Sivadhanu doesnot like the idea to be living in Chokkalinga's house after marriage,mudaliar convinces him.

Soon after moving into Chokkalinga's house,Sivadhanu feels 
he is treated as man servant and his independence is lost.
His friend (Pushpavanam Kuppusamy) stumbles upon him and remarks that one poor person should never be married to rich bride and live with father in law,since they will always treat them inferiority.

Soon Sivadhanu plans to move separately finding a job in NLC as a geologist.Chokkalingam is angry that his son in law has disobeyed him.

Cast

Production
After the critically acclaimed Azhagi, Thangar Bachan announced his next project "Solla Marantha Kadhai". The director chose Cheran because he fitted the bill, says Thangar Bachan, "I had also watched Cheran direct his artistes in 'Pandvar Bhoomi' for which i was the cinematographer. I was amazed at the expressions he brought to his face, and when i was casting for my film, his was the first name that came to my mind". The film marked the debut of folk-singer Pushpavanam Kuppusamy as actor. An 80-day shooting schedule was held at locations in Panruti, Cuddalore, Vadalur and Chidambaram.

Music

Critical reception
The Hindu wrote:"Thankar Bachan's story telling skill stirred you in "Azhagi" but somehow the magic is missing this time". Sify wrote "After that fairy tale Azhagi, Thankar Bachchan's second attempt to produce another whiff of romance with Solla Marantha Kathai has turned sour. The film is a mushy sentimental hogwash that reminds you of the tearjerkers of 50's and 60's."

References

2002 films
Films scored by Ilaiyaraaja
2000s Tamil-language films
Indian drama films
Films based on Indian novels
Films set in Tamil Nadu
Films shot in Tamil Nadu
Films directed by Thangar Bachan
2002 drama films